Broken River (Māori: Te Waka Ski Awa O Broken) is a club skifield in South Island, New Zealand. The skifield claims to often have the longest ski season anywhere in Australasia.

The difficulty distribution is 10% beginner, 40% intermediate, 50% advanced.

Accommodation is in the form of three lodges: the full-service Lyndon Lodge, the more basic 28-bed Broken River Lodge, and the very basic 14-bed White Star Chalet for backpackers. Access to the accommodation is via a 15- to 30-minute walk from the carpark. There is a passenger lift (formerly a goods lift) between the carpark and the accommodation.

The field also has a day lodge, Palmer Lodge, which has self-catering available as well as food and drink availability.

See also 
 List of funicular railways

References

External links

Broken River Ski Area
Broken River Ski Area trail map

 

Ski areas and resorts in Canterbury, New Zealand
Funicular railways in New Zealand